In Greek mythology, Scaea (Ancient Greek: Σκαιήν means "left, on the left hand"), was one of the Danaids.

Family
Scaea was the daughter of Danaus, king of Libya and of Europe, a queen. She was the full sister of other Danaids namely Automate, Amymone and Agave. Scaea was married to Daiphron, son of Aegyptus and later to Archander of whom she had begotten a son, Metanastes.

Mythology
Scaea like her other sisters, except Hypermnestra, killed their husbands on their wedding night at the behest of their father Danaus. Because of the murder, later on, Scaea and her sisters were punished in afterlife, being forced to carry a jug to fill a bathtub (pithos) without a bottom (or with a leak) to wash their sins off. The water was always leaking that they would forever try to fill the tub.

In some accounts, Scaea remarried Archander while her sister Automate took as husband his brother Architeles. These two were sons of Achaeus, coming from Phthiotis to settle in Argos.

Notes

References 

 Apollodorus, The Library with an English Translation by Sir James George Frazer, F.B.A., F.R.S. in 2 Volumes, Cambridge, MA, Harvard University Press; London, William Heinemann Ltd. 1921. ISBN 0-674-99135-4. Online version at the Perseus Digital Library. Greek text available from the same website.
 Pausanias, Description of Greece with an English Translation by W.H.S. Jones, Litt.D., and H.A. Ormerod, M.A., in 4 Volumes. Cambridge, MA, Harvard University Press; London, William Heinemann Ltd. 1918. . Online version at the Perseus Digital Library
 Pausanias, Graeciae Descriptio. 3 vols. Leipzig, Teubner. 1903.  Greek text available at the Perseus Digital Library.

Princesses in Greek mythology